Artus de Penguern (13 March 1957 – 14 May 2013) was a French director, writer and actor of Breton descent.

On stage

Filmography

References

External links 

1957 births
French film directors
2013 deaths
French people of Breton descent